The 20th World Athletics Indoor Championships is re-scheduled to be held from 14 to 16 March 2025 in Nanjing, People's Republic of China at the newly built Nanjing's Cube gymnasium at the Nanjing Youth Olympic Sports Park. In January 2020, the event was postponed until March 2021 due to the COVID-19 pandemic. This would be the city's first hosting of the event. In December 2020, the event was postponed until March 2023 due to the COVID-19 pandemic. The next edition of the World Athletics Indoor Championships will now be in Glasgow on 1-3 March 2024.

Bidding process
Nanjing won the bid for the Championships. Delegations from the three candidate cities made their presentations to Council in the following order (after the drawing of lots): Nanjing (CHN), Belgrade (SRB) and Toruń (POL).

Portland was selected unanimously to host the 2016 event with Birmingham being the only other bidder. With Portland then out of the running for the 2018 event Birmingham was selected as the host of the 2018 event. The reason Portland was selected for 2016 and Birmingham being selected in 2018 is that the IAAF wanted more time between events in the UK with London hosting the 2012 Summer Olympics as well as the 2017 World Championships in Athletics along with Cardiff hosting the 2016 IAAF World Half Marathon Championships. Portland would become the beginning of a similar sequence for the US, with the 2021 World Championships in Eugene, Oregon and the 2028 Summer Olympics in Los Angeles.

Planning

The event was originally scheduled for 13 – 15 March 2020. On 29 January 2020 World Athletics announced that the event would be postponed to March 2021 due to the COVID-19 pandemic. On 12 March 2020 it was announced that the championships would take place on 19–21 March in 2021, with the event timetable being the same as originally announced.

Venue
The facility, a brand new purpose-built gymnasium at the Nanjing Youth Olympic Sports Park known as Nanjing's Cube will be the centrepiece of the event. Construction started in September 2017 and is due to be completed in time for the event. The venue for track and field and swimming are located in Block A of the park and to the east is the Yangtze River complex. It will provide catering and hotels as well as security work for the event.

Entry standards
The qualification period for all events runs from 1 January 2019 to 2 March 2020 (midnight Monaco time), except for the Combined Events. Twelve athletes will be invited in the Heptathlon and in the Pentathlon as follows: the winner of the 2019 Combined Events Challenge, the five best athletes from the 2019 Outdoor Lists (as at 31 December 2019), limited to a maximum of one per country and the five best athletes from the 2020 Indoor Lists (as at 24 February 2020). One athlete may be invited at the discretion of the IAAF. In total no more than two male and two female athletes from any one Member will be invited for the combined events. The winners of the World Indoor tour received wildcards to the championships, allowing nations with wildcards to enter up to 3 athletes into individual events.

Medal summary

Men

Women

References

External links
World Athletics website

World Athletics Indoor Championships
World Indoor Championships
International athletics competitions hosted by China
21st century in China
Athletics World Indoor Championships 2025
World Athletics Indoor Championshipss